The 1952 Campeonato Nacional de Fútbol Profesional was first tier’s 20th season. Everton were the tournament’s champions.

Scores

Matches 1–22
During matches 1–22 each team played every other team twice.

Matches 23–33
During matches 23–33 each team played every other team once. This means that during matches 1-33 each team played every other team 3 times.

Standings

Topscorer

References

External links
ANFP 
RSSSF Chile 1952

Primera División de Chile seasons
Primera
Chile